Travis Daniels (born January 25, 1992) is an American professional basketball player for Gladiators Trier of the German ProA league. He played college basketball for Shelton State CC and Mississippi State. He has played professionally in Canada, the Dominican Republic, Romania, Bulgaria, Cyprus and Greece.

High school career
As a senior at Russellville Daniels averaged 10.7 points and 7.7 rebounds. He led his team to a 24–10 record and won the Region 5A-1 championship before losing in the Elite 8 in the AhSAA Class 5A playoffs. He was also named honorable mention for Class 5A by the Alabama Sports Writers' Association and was tabbed to the Willis Valley Shootout and Regional All-Tournament teams.

College career
Daniels played college basketball for the Shelton State Community College from 2012 to 2014 and for Mississippi State from 2014 to 2016.

Professional career
After going undrafted in the 2016 NBA draft, Daniels joined Phoenix Galați of the Liga Națională. On November, he left Phoenix Galați and joined Balkan Botevgrad of the Bulgarian league. He was voted as the Bulgarian Cup MVP. On May 21, 2017, he joined Leones de Santo Domingo until the end of the season.

On August 2, 2017, Daniels joined Rethymno Cretan Kings of the Greek Basket League. During his first season with the club, he averaged 8.8 points and 5 rebounds per game. He made his best appearance with Rethymno against Lavrio, having 18 points 7 rebounds and 1 assist. On June 22, 2018, he renewed his contract until 2019.

After a brief stint in Canada for the Edmonton Stingers, Daniels returned to Greece and signed with Kolossos Rodou on August 8, 2019. Daniels averaged 6.1 points and 5.1 rebounds per game in 19 games before the season was suspended due to the COVID-19 pandemic. He returned to the Stingers for its second season. Daniels averaged 12.6 points, 5.3 rebounds, 1.1 assists and 1.5 blocks per game with Edmonton. On September 29, 2020, he signed with Keravnos of the Cypriot league.

Daniels joined Saskatchewan Rattlers of the Canadian Elite Basketball League in 2021. In 14 games, he averaged 11.1 points, 6.3 rebounds, and 1.4 assists per game. On October 5, 2021, Daniels signed with Iraklis of the Greek Basket League.

On October 8, 2022, he signed with Gladiators Trier of the German ProA.

References

External links
Mississippi State Bulldogs bio
Eurobasket.com profile

1992 births
Living people
American expatriate basketball people in Bulgaria
American expatriate basketball people in Canada
American expatriate basketball people in the Dominican Republic
American expatriate basketball people in Greece
American expatriate basketball people in Romania
American men's basketball players
Basketball players from Alabama
BC Balkan Botevgrad players
Iraklis Thessaloniki B.C. players
Junior college men's basketball players in the United States
Kolossos Rodou B.C. players
Mississippi State Bulldogs men's basketball players
People from Eutaw, Alabama
Power forwards (basketball)
Rethymno B.C. players
Shelton State Community College alumni
Shelton State Buccaneers men's basketball players
Small forwards